Diamonds Are Forever is a 1971 spy film, the seventh in the James Bond series produced by Eon Productions. It is the sixth and final Eon film to star Sean Connery, who returned to the role as the fictional MI6 agent James Bond, having declined to reprise the role in On Her Majesty's Secret Service (1969).

The film is based on Ian Fleming's 1956 novel of the same name and is the second of four James Bond films directed by Guy Hamilton. The story has Bond impersonating a diamond smuggler to infiltrate a smuggling ring and soon uncovering a plot by his old enemy Ernst Stavro Blofeld to use the diamonds to build a space-based laser weapon. Bond has to battle his enemy for one last time to stop the smuggling and stall Blofeld's plan of destroying Washington, D.C. and extorting the world with nuclear supremacy.

After George Lazenby left the series, producers Harry Saltzman and Albert R. Broccoli tested other actors, but studio United Artists wanted Connery back, paying a then-record $1.25 million salary for him to return. The producers were inspired by Goldfinger; as with that film, Guy Hamilton was hired to direct, and Shirley Bassey performed vocals on the title theme song. Locations included Las Vegas, California, and Amsterdam. Diamonds Are Forever was a commercial success and received positive reviews, though retrospective reviews were critical of its camp tone.  It was nominated for the Academy Award for Best Sound.

Plot

James Bond—agent 007—pursues Ernst Stavro Blofeld and eventually finds him at a facility where Blofeld look-alikes are being created through plastic surgery. Bond kills a test subject, and later the "real" Blofeld, by drowning him in a pool of superheated mud.

While assassins Mr. Wint and Mr. Kidd systematically kill several diamond smugglers, M suspects that South African diamonds are being stockpiled to depress prices by dumping, and assigns Bond to uncover the smuggling ring. Disguised as professional smuggler and assassin Peter Franks, Bond travels to Amsterdam to meet contact Tiffany Case. The real Franks shows up on the way, but Bond intercepts and kills him, then switches IDs to make it seem like Franks is Bond. Tiffany and Bond then go to Los Angeles, smuggling the diamonds inside Franks' corpse.

At the airport, Bond meets his CIA ally Felix Leiter, then travels to Las Vegas. At a funeral home, Franks' body is cremated and the diamonds are passed on to another smuggler, Shady Tree. Bond is nearly killed by Wint and Kidd when they try to cremate him, but Tree stops the process when he discovers that the diamonds in Franks' body were fakes, planted by Bond and the CIA. Bond tells Leiter to ship the real diamonds. Bond then goes to the Whyte House, a casino-hotel owned by the reclusive billionaire Willard Whyte, where Tree works as a stand-up comedian. Bond discovers there that Tree has been killed by Wint and Kidd, who did not know that the diamonds were fake.

At the craps table Bond meets the opportunistic Plenty O'Toole, and after gambling, brings her to his room. Gangsters ambush them, throwing O'Toole out the window and into the pool. Bond spends the rest of the night with Tiffany, instructing her to retrieve the diamonds at the Circus Circus casino. Tiffany reneges on her deal and flees, passing off the diamonds to the next smuggler. However, seeing that O'Toole was killed after being mistaken for her, Tiffany changes her mind. She drives Bond to the airport, where the diamonds are given to Whyte's casino manager, Bert Saxby, who is followed to a remote facility. Bond enters the apparent destination of the diamonds — a research laboratory owned by Whyte, where a satellite is being built by Professor Doctor Metz, a laser refraction specialist. When Bond's cover is blown, he escapes by stealing a moon buggy and reunites with Tiffany.

Bond scales the walls to the Whyte House's top floor to confront Whyte. He is instead met by two identical Blofelds, who use an electronic device to sound like Whyte. Bond kills one of the Blofelds, which turns out to be a look-alike. He is then knocked out by gas, picked up by Wint and Kidd and taken out to Las Vegas Valley, where he is placed in a pipeline and left to die. Bond escapes, then calls Blofeld, using a similar electronic device to pose as Saxby. He finds out Whyte's location and rescues him, Saxby being killed in the gunfight. In the meantime, Blofeld abducts Case. With the help of Whyte, Bond raids the lab and uncovers Blofeld's plot to create a laser satellite using the diamonds, which by now has already been sent into orbit. With the satellite, Blofeld destroys nuclear weapons in China, the Soviet Union and the United States, then proposes an international auction for global nuclear supremacy.

Whyte identifies an oil platform off the coast of Baja California as Blofeld's base of operations. After Bond's attempt to change the cassette containing the satellite control codes fails due to a mistake by Tiffany, a helicopter attack on the oil rig is launched by Leiter and the CIA. Blofeld tries to escape in a midget submarine. Bond gains control of the submarine's launch crane and uses the sub as a wrecking ball, destroying both the satellite control and the base. Bond and Tiffany then head for Britain on a cruise ship, where Wint and Kidd pose as room-service stewards and attempt to kill them with a hidden bomb. Bond kills them instead.

Cast
 Sean Connery as James Bond: British MI6 agent 007.
 Jill St. John as Tiffany Case: A diamond smuggler.
 Charles Gray as Ernst Stavro Blofeld: The head of SPECTRE and Bond's arch-enemy. Gray had previously appeared in the series when he played Dikko Henderson in 1967's You Only Live Twice.
 Lana Wood as Plenty O'Toole: A woman Bond meets at a casino.
 Jimmy Dean as Willard Whyte: An entrepreneur, loosely based on Howard Hughes.
 Bruce Cabot as Albert R. 'Bert' Saxby: Whyte's casino manager who is in cahoots with Blofeld. His name is a reference to the producer Albert R. Broccoli.
 Bruce Glover and Putter Smith as Mr. Wint and Mr. Kidd: Blofeld's henchmen.
 Norman Burton as Felix Leiter: A CIA agent, and Bond's ally in tracking Blofeld.
 Joseph Furst as Dr. Metz: A scientist who is the world's leading expert on laser refraction, who is on Blofeld's payroll.
 Bernard Lee as M: Head of MI6.
 Desmond Llewelyn as Q: Head of MI6's technical department.
 Leonard Barr as Shady Tree: A stand-up comedian and smuggler.
 Lois Maxwell as Miss Moneypenny: M's secretary.
 Margaret Lacey as Mrs. Whistler, a teacher and diamond smuggler.
 Joe Robinson as Peter Franks: A diamond smuggler whose identity is taken by Bond.
 David de Keyser as Doctor.
 Laurence Naismith as Sir Donald Munger: A diamond expert who brings the case to MI6.
 David Bauer as Morton Slumber: President of Slumber Incorporated, a funeral home.
 Sid Haig as Slumber Inc. attendant.

Lola Larson and Trina Parks portray Bambi and Thumper, Whyte's bodyguards. Ed Bishop portrayed Klaus Hergersheimer, a scientist involved with building the satellite. In uncredited roles, Shane Rimmer appeared as Tom, the director of Whyte's astronautics facility; Marc Lawrence portrayed a Slumber Inc. attendant,  Henry Rowland as Doctor Tynan, and Cassandra Peterson as a dancer. Peterson admits in her autobiography that she was in the film but believes she didn't make the final edit. It has been rumoured that Peterson and later star Valerie Perrine played Shady Tree's "Acorns", the showgirls who support him during his standup routine.  They were actually played by performers Jennifer Castle and Pat Gill.

Production
The producers originally intended to have Diamonds Are Forever re-create commercially successful aspects of Goldfinger, including hiring its director, Guy Hamilton. Peter R. Hunt, who had directed On Her Majesty's Secret Service and worked in all previous Bond films as editor, was invited before Hamilton, but due to involvement with another project could only work on the film if the production date was postponed, which the producers declined to do. As a condition for Hamilton directing after his difficulties with trade unions during the filming of Battle of Britain, Diamonds Are Forever was the first Bond production to be primarily based in the United States rather than the United Kingdom.

Writing
While On Her Majesty's Secret Service was in post-production, Richard Maibaum wrote several drafts about Bond avenging the death of his wife Tracy. The characters Irma Bunt and Marc-Ange Draco were set to return. Harry Saltzman had suggested Thailand and India as potential filming locations. When George Lazenby departed from the role prior to the film's release, a complete rewrite was requested, in addition to Maibaum's script failing to impress Albert R. Broccoli and Saltzman. Following this, Maibaum wrote an original script with Auric Goldfinger's twin seeking revenge for the death of his brother. In this version, Goldfinger's brother was a Swedish shipping magnate armed with a laser cannon held within the hull of a supertanker. The idea was borrowed from an early draft of On Her Majesty's Secret Service in which Ernst Stavro Blofeld was to be Goldfinger's twin brother, with Gert Fröbe set to return. The film would have ended with a boat chase of Chinese junks and Roman galleys on Lake Mead. The plot was later changed after Broccoli had a dream, where his close friend Howard Hughes was replaced by an imposter. Hence, the character of Willard Whyte was created, and Tom Mankiewicz was chosen to rework the script.

Mankiewicz says he was hired because Broccoli wanted an American writer to work on the script, since so much of it was set in Las Vegas "and the Brits write really lousy American gangsters" – but it had to be someone who also understood the British idiom, since it had British characters. David Picker, then-president of United Artists, had seen the stage musical Georgy written by Mankiewicz, and recommended him; he was hired on a two-week trial and kept on for the rest of the movie. The idea of Goldfinger's brother was scrapped, and Blofeld was written back into the script. Mankiewicz later estimated the novel provided around 45 minutes of the film's final running time. The adaptation eliminated the main villains from the source Ian Fleming novel, mobsters called Jack and Seraffimo Spang, but used the henchmen Shady Tree, Mr. Wint and Mr. Kidd.

Casting
George Lazenby was originally offered a contract for seven Bond films but declined and left after just one, On Her Majesty's Secret Service, on the advice of his agent Ronan O'Rahilly. Producers contemplated replacing him with John Gavin, though actors Clint Eastwood, Adam West, Burt Reynolds, Robert Wagner, Brett Halsey, Malcolm Roberts, and Ranulph Fiennes had also been considered; Eastwood, Reynolds, and West had stated that Bond should not be played by an American actor. Michael Gambon rejected an offer, telling Broccoli that he was "in terrible shape". Producers Albert R. Broccoli and Harry Saltzman wanted to cast Roger Moore, but he was busy filming The Persuaders!.

Picker was unhappy with this decision and made it clear that Connery was to be enticed back to the role and that money was no object. When approached about resuming the role of Bond, Connery demanded the fee of $1.25 million. To entice the actor to play Bond once more, United Artists offered two back-to-back films of his choice. After both sides agreed to the deal, Connery used the fee to establish the Scottish International Education Trust, where Scottish artists could apply for funding without having to leave their country to pursue their careers. Since John Gavin was no longer in the running for the role, his contract was paid in full by United Artists. The first film made under Connery's deal was The Offence, directed by his friend Sidney Lumet.

Charles Gray was cast as villain Ernst Stavro Blofeld, after playing a Bond ally named Dikko Henderson in You Only Live Twice (1967). Jazz musician Putter Smith was invited by Saltzman to play Mr. Kidd, after a Thelonious Monk Band show. Musician Paul Williams was originally cast as Mr. Wint. When he couldn't agree with the producers on compensation, Bruce Glover replaced him. Glover said he was surprised at being chosen, because at first producers said he was too normal and that they wanted a deformed, Peter Lorre-like actor. Bruce Cabot, who played the part of Bert Saxby, died the following year; Diamonds turned out to be his final film role. Jimmy Dean was cast as Willard Whyte after Saltzman saw a presentation of him. Dean was very worried about playing a Howard Hughes pastiche, because he was an employee of Hughes at the Desert Inn.

Jill St. John had originally been offered the part of Plenty O'Toole but landed the female lead after Sidney Korshak, who assisted the producers in filming in Las Vegas locations, recommended his client St. John, who became the first American Bond girl. Linda Thorson met with Cubby Broccoli, hoping to be considered for the part of Case, but he never considered her for the role, although he did briefly list her as a possibility for the part of Plenty O'Toole. Some time later, Broccoli told Thorson she was never cast in a Bond film because she didn't have long hair. Lana Wood was cast as Plenty O'Toole, following a suggestion of screenwriter Tom Mankiewicz. Wood modeled her performance after Leigh Taylor-Young and Minnie Mouse. Denise Perrier, Miss World 1953, played "Marie", the woman in the bikini who is forced by Bond to disclose the location of Blofeld.

A cameo appearance by Sammy Davis Jr. playing on the roulette table was filmed, but his scene was eventually deleted.

Initially, the character of Miss Moneypenny did not feature in the movie, partly because Lois Maxwell had held out for a pay increase, but it was decided during production to add the scene where, disguised as a customs officer, Moneypenny gives Bond his travel documents at the port of Dover. The additional scene was a last-minute rewrite, as the producers felt it important to incorporate Maxwell after her issue was resolved. Maxwell and Connery filmed their lines separately for the short scene.

Filming

Filming began on 5 April 1971, with the South African scenes actually shot in the desert near Las Vegas. The scene was originally written to include Mr. Wint and Mr. Kidd killing Dr. Tynan by forcing a scorpion down his mouth, but it was rewritten in order to be approved by British censors. The film was shot primarily in the United States, with locations including the Los Angeles International Airport, Universal City Studios and eight hotels of Las Vegas. Besides Pinewood Studios in Buckinghamshire, other places in England were Dover and Southampton. The climactic oil rig sequence was shot off the shore of Oceanside, California. Other filming locations included Cap D'Antibes in France for the opening scenes, Amsterdam and Frankfurt Airport.

Filming in Las Vegas took place mostly in hotels owned by Howard Hughes, for he was a friend of Cubby Broccoli's. Getting the streets empty to shoot was achieved through the collaboration of Hughes, the Las Vegas police, and the shopkeepers' association. The Las Vegas Hilton doubled for the Whyte House, and since the owner of the Circus Circus was a Bond fan, he allowed the Circus to be used on film and even made a cameo. The cinematographers said filming in Las Vegas at night had an advantage: no additional illumination was required due to the high number of neon lights. Sean Connery made the most of his time on location in Las Vegas. "I didn't get any sleep at all. We shot every night, I caught all the shows and played golf all day. On the weekend I collapsed – boy, did I collapse. Like a skull with legs." He also played the slot machines, and once delayed a scene because he was collecting his winnings. While shooting in Las Vegas, Connery dated his co-star Lana Wood and Jill St. John.

The home of Kirk Douglas was used for the scene in Tiffany's house, while the Elrod House in Palm Springs, designed by John Lautner, became Willard Whyte's house. The exterior shots of the Slumber Mortuary were of the Palm Mortuary in Henderson, Nevada. The interiors were a set constructed at Pinewood Studios, where Ken Adam imitated the real building's lozenge-shaped stained glass window in its chapel. The Garden of Remembrance scene was shot at Palm Downtown Cemetery, Las Vegas.  During location filming, Ken Adam visited several funeral homes in the Las Vegas area, and the inspiration behind the gaudy design of the Slumber Mortuary, for example the use of tasteless Art Nouveau furniture and Tiffany lamps came from these experiences. Production wrapped with the crematorium sequence, on 13 August 1971.

Since the car chase in Las Vegas would have many car crashes, the filmmakers had a product placement arrangement with Ford to use their vehicles. Ford's only demand was that Sean Connery had to drive the 1971 Mustang Mach 1 which serves as Tiffany Case's car. A Mustang was used in Goldfinger and Thunderball, while a Mercury Cougar was used in On Her Majesty's Secret Service, and "Bond girls" drove each one. The moon buggy was inspired by the NASA lunar rover, but with additions such as flailing arms since the producers didn't find the design "outrageous" enough. Built by custom car fabricator Dean Jeffries on a rear-engined Corvair chassis, it was capable of road speeds. The fibreglass tires had to be replaced during the chase sequence because the heat and irregular desert soil ruined them.

Hamilton had the idea of making a fight scene inside a lift, which was choreographed and performed by Sean Connery and stuntman Joe Robinson. During a car chase scene, where the police are chasing Bond in a small parking lot, the Mustang was to jump a small ramp over several cars. The hired stunt driver they had couldn't perform this and wrecked two or three cars in the process. The stunt team had only one automobile left so they called Bill Hickman, who drove for hours to the location, jumped into the Mustang, and did the stunt in one take. A continuity mistake during the same car chase made it into the film's final cut: when Bond drives the Mustang on two wheels through a narrow alley, the car enters the alley on its right side tires and exits driving on its left side.

While filming the scene of finding Plenty O'Toole drowned in Tiffany's swimming pool, Lana Wood actually had her feet loosely tied to a cement block on the bottom. Film crew members held a rope across the pool for her, with which she could lift her face out of the water to breathe between takes. The pool was steeped in a way that made the block move deeper with each take. Eventually, Wood was submerged but was noticed by on-lookers and rescued before actually drowning. Wood, being a certified diver, took some water but remained calm during the ordeal, although she later admitted to a few "very uncomfortable moments and quite some struggling until they pulled me out."

Music

The original soundtrack was once again composed by John Barry, his sixth time composing for a Bond film. "Diamonds Are Forever", the title song, was the second James Bond theme to be performed by Shirley Bassey, after "Goldfinger" in 1964.

With Connery back in the lead role, the "James Bond Theme" was played by an electric guitar in the somewhat unusual, blued gun barrel sequence accompanied with prismatic ripples of light, in the pre-credits sequence, and in a full orchestral version during a hovercraft sequence in Amsterdam.

Release and reception
Diamonds are Forever was released on 14 December 1971 in Munich, West Germany and on 16 December in Sydney and Melbourne, Australia, before opening in 44 other cities in the United States, Canada and Europe on 17 December and 11 more cities in Japan, New Zealand and Europe on 18 December 1971. It grossed $2,242,557 in its opening six days worldwide, including $1,569,249 in its opening weekend in the United States and Canada, where it finished number one at the box office for the week. The film had its UK premiere at the Odeon Leicester Square on 30 December 1971. In its first 17 days in the United States and Canada to 2 January 1972 it grossed $16,238,915 and had grossed $8,330,000 overseas to the same date, for a worldwide total of $24,568,915, which United Artists claimed was a record in such a short period.

Diamonds are Forever was number one in the United States for seven consecutive weeks and went on to gross $116 million worldwide, of which $43 million was from the United States and Canada. In the United Kingdom Diamonds are Forever was the second highest grossing film of 1971, being beaten by On the Buses.

Contemporary reviews
Roger Ebert of the Chicago Sun-Times noted, in a positive review, the irrelevance of the plot and "moments of silliness", such as Bond finding himself driving a moon buggy with antennae revolving and robot arms flapping. He praised the Las Vegas car chase scene, particularly the segment when Bond drives the Ford Mustang on two wheels. Vincent Canby of The New York Times enthusiastically praised the film as:  Jay Cocks, reviewing for Time magazine, felt Diamonds Are Forever was "in some ways the best of the lot. It is by all odds the broadest—which is to say wackiest, not sexiest." He praised Connery as "a fine, forceful actor with an undeniable presence [who] turns his well-publicized contempt for the Bond character into some wry moments of self-parody. He is capable of doing better things, but whether he likes it or not, he is the perfect, the only James Bond." Gene Siskel of the Chicago Tribune wrote the film is "not merely bad Bond, it is a bad movie. A disjointed script competes with, of all things, a lack of action for responsibility for this failure. The women are unappealing even to Bond, judging from his lack of ardor and the villains are hardly threatening."

Peter Schjeldahl of The New York Times described Diamonds Are Forever as "a pretty good movie—not great art, but fantastic packaging. The best (or, anyway, the best worst) of the classic formulae—notably, gimmickry and exoticism a go go—have been retained, some up‐dating elements have been added and other elements have been fudged." Variety wrote that James Bond "still packs a lethal wallop in all his cavortings, still manages to surround himself with scantily-clad sexpots. Yet Diamonds Are Forever doesn't carry the same quality or flair as its many predecessors. Apparently Messrs. Albert R. Broccoli and Harry Saltzman, who have made a fortune producing these Ian Fleming-inspired mellers, have reached that point where a sustained story means little in prepping an 007 picture. That is what this latest in the series lacks, and for this reason there can be no suspense. But action there is, plenty of it in the familiar Bond manner."

The film was nominated for an Academy Award for Best Sound for Gordon McCallum, John W. Mitchell and Al Overton.

Retrospective reviews
Twenty-five years after its release, James Berardinelli criticised the concept of a laser-shooting satellite, and the performances of Jill St. John, Norman Burton and Jimmy Dean. Christopher Null called St. John "one of the least effective Bond girls – beautiful, but shrill and helpless".

According to Danny Peary, Diamonds are Forever is "one of the most forgettable movies of the entire Bond series" and that "until Blofeld's reappearance we must watch what is no better than a mundane diamond-smuggling melodrama, without the spectacle we associate with James Bond: the Las Vegas setting isn't exotic enough, there's little humour, assassins Mr. Kidd and Mr. Wint are similar to characters you'd find on The Avengers, but not nearly as amusing – and the trouble Bond gets into, even Maxwell Smart could escape." IGN chose it as the third worst James Bond film, behind only The Man with the Golden Gun and Die Another Day. Total Film listed Mr. Wint and Mr. Kidd, and Bambi and Thumper, as the first and second worst villains in the Bond series (respectively).
 Far Out Magazine were more critical, stating that Connery's finished performance made it hard to justify his portrayal, particularly in the light of some of his more accomplished successors: "Seemingly happy with his lot by Goldfinger, Connery was making it harder to justify his existence, especially evident in Diamonds Are Forever, the film that was responsible for the comical and misjudged decisions the series would take in the 1970s." The film was more positively received by Xan Brooks of The Guardian, who said it was "oddly brilliant, the best of the bunch: the perfect bleary Bond film for an imperfect bleary western world."

On the review aggregator website Rotten Tomatoes, the film holds an approval rating of 66% based on 47 reviews with an average rating of 6.3/10. The website's consensus states, "Diamonds are Forever'' is a largely derivative affair, but it's still pretty entertaining nonetheless, thanks to great stunts, witty dialogue, and the presence of Sean Connery."

See also
 List of films set in Las Vegas
 Outline of James Bond

References

Sources

External links

 
 
 
 
 
 MGM Official website

1971 films
1970s action thriller films
1970s spy films
British sequel films
Cold War spy films
1970s English-language films
Fictional portrayals of the Las Vegas Metropolitan Police Department
British films about revenge
Films about extortion
Films about terrorism in the United States
Films directed by Guy Hamilton
Films produced by Harry Saltzman
Films produced by Albert R. Broccoli
Films scored by John Barry (composer)
Films set in Amsterdam
Films set in Kent
Films set in the Las Vegas Valley
Films set in London
Films set in Los Angeles
Films set in South Africa
Films shot at Pinewood Studios
Films shot in California
Films shot in England
Films shot in France
Films shot in Frankfurt
Films shot in the Las Vegas Valley
Films shot in London
Films shot in Los Angeles
Films shot in Amsterdam
James Bond films
Films with screenplays by Tom Mankiewicz
United Artists films
Eon Productions films
Films with screenplays by Richard Maibaum
1970s British films